William Huntington may refer to:
William Huntington (preacher) (1745–1813), preacher and coalheaver in London
William Edwards Huntington (1844–1930), American academic
William H. Huntington (1848–?), American politician
William Reed Huntington (1838–1909), American priest and writer
William Huntington (Mormon) (1784–1846), early Mormon leader
William Henry Huntington (1820–1885), American journalist
William R. Huntington (1907–1990), American architect